Pitono is an Indonesian footballer who currently plays for Persela Lamongan as a defender.

References

External links
 

Indonesian footballers
1985 births
Living people
Association football defenders
Sportspeople from Malang
Persema Malang players
Persela Lamongan players